Saint Praxedis is an oil painting attributed to Johannes Vermeer. This attribution has often been questioned. However, in 2014 the auction house Christie's announced the results of new investigations which in their opinion demonstrate conclusively that it is a Vermeer.  The painting is a copy of a work by Felice Ficherelli, and depicts the early Roman martyr, Saint Praxedis or Praxedes. It may be Vermeer's earliest surviving work, dating from 1655.

Description and date
The painting shows the saint squeezing a martyr's blood from a sponge into an ornate vessel. It is closely related to a work by Ficherelli from 1640–45, now in the Collection Fergnani in Ferrara, and is generally assumed to be a copy of it (though see below for an alternative interpretation).  The most obvious difference between the two is that there is no crucifix in the Ferrara work. It is Vermeer's only known close copy of another work.

This is one of only four dated Vermeer paintings, the others being The Procuress (1656), The Astronomer (1668) and The Geographer (1669).  Vermeer's two early history paintings, Christ in the House of Martha and Mary and Diana and Her Companions, are dated by almost all art historians to 1654-6, although opinions differ as to which is earlier.

Provenance and 2014 sale
The painting's provenance before the mid-twentieth century is unknown. The collector Jacob Reder bought it at a minor auction house in New York in 1943. It first received significant attention as a possible Vermeer when being shown as a part of an exhibition of Florentine Baroque art at the Metropolitan Museum of Art in New York in 1969. The exhibition catalogue drew attention to the signature "Meer 1655" and Michael Kitson, reviewing the exhibition, suggested it could be a genuine Vermeer on the basis of stylistic similarities to Diana and Her Companions. Following Reder's death (also in 1969) it was bought by the art dealer Spencer A. Samuels, who also believed it to be a Vermeer. The Barbara Piasecka Johnson Collection Foundation bought it from Spencer in 1987. The leading Vermeer scholar Arthur K. Wheelock Jr. subsequently argued the case for the attribution to Vermeer in an article devoted to it in 1986.

The painting was not included in the exhibition "The Young Vermeer" held in The Hague, Dresden and Edinburgh in 2010-11. However it was included in an exhibition of Vermeer's work held in Rome in 2012–13, curated by Wheelock, Liedtke and Sandrina Bandera.

It was sold at Christie's in London on 8 July 2014 on behalf of the Barbara Piasecka Johnson Collection Foundation.  It sold to an unknown buyer for £6,242,500 (US$10,687,160), at the lower end of the estimated price range of £6-£8 million.  Some art market commentators speculated that doubt about the attribution to Vermeer may have contributed to the relatively low price.  From March 2015 it has been on display in the National Museum of Western Art in Tokyo, labelled as "attributed to Johannes Vermeer". This appears to be a long-term loan to the museum from a private collector.

Debates over attribution

The painting may have two signatures.  The more obvious of the two reads "Meer 1655", while the second appears as "Meer N R o o".  It is possible that this second signature originally read "Meer naar Riposo", or "Vermeer after Riposo": Riposo was Ficherelli's nickname. The Doerner Institute's examination of the signatures concluded that both signatures were original and composed of pigments typical of the painting. Wheelock's examination also led him to conclude that both signatures were original, and recent technical examination has demonstrated that the clearer signature is likely to have been added at, or close to, the date the painting was created. However these new investigations agreed with the earlier opinion of the conservator Jørgen Wadum that the possible second signature is too indistinct to be deciphered.

Analysis of the lead white, performed by the Rijksmuseum, in association with the Free University, Amsterdam used in the painting demonstrates a Dutch or Flemish origin, with a strong possibility that the pigment came from the same batch used for Vermeer's Diana and Her Companions.  The use of a chalk ground is also typically Dutch, and there is an unusually extensive use of ultramarine, typical of Vermeer's later work, though not of Diana and Her Companions or Christ in the House of Martha and Mary. Wheelock identifies stylistic similarities with two history paintings which are universally attributed to Vermeer. He also notes similarities between the depiction of the saint's face and the figure in Vermeer's A Girl Asleep and argues that the painter's conversion to Catholicism would have given him an interest in the subject matter. Although it is thought unlikely that the Ferrara painting ever left Italy, or that Vermeer visited Italy, Wheelock points out that he had a reputation as an authority on Italian art. It is possible that another version or copy of the Ferrara painting was the model for Vermeer's work.

In 1998, Wadum argued that the painting was not a copy of the work in Ferrara, or indeed of any other work, because the background elements were painted before the foreground, as is typical of an original work rather than a copy. In 2014 Christie's put forward the argument that this could be explained as experimentation by Vermeer, the young artist trying to recreate and adapt the technique used to create the original.

Notes

Further reading

External links
 Essential Vermeer: St Praxedis
 Jørgen Wadum: Contours of Vermeer
 Jon Boone: St Praxedis, Missing the Mark

1650s paintings
Religious paintings by Johannes Vermeer